Kasper Salto (born 14 February  1967) is a Danish industrial designer, most known for his furniture designs. He is the grand son of painter, ceramist and writer Axel Salto.

Biography
Kasper Salto was born on 14 February 1967 in Copenhagen, Denmark, as the son of textile artist Naja Salto and grandson of leading Danish ceramist Axel Salto. He first trained as a cabinet maker before attending the Danish Design School, graduating in 1994. From 1994 to 98 he worked for designer Rud Thygesen. At that time he met Peter Staerk: their friendship would have a deep influence on his professional life. In 1997, he designed the Runner chair for Peter Staerk who made the chair famous in Denmark, but also abroad. 

In 1998 Salto opened his own design studio, working for companies such as Fritz Hansen, DubaB8, Engelbrechts and Lightyears.  In 2003 he opened a new office, Salto & Sigsgaard, together with  architect Thomas Sigsgaard.

Selected works
 Runner chair, DubaB8
 ICE chair,  Fritz Hansen A/S
 NAP chair,  Fritz Hansen A/S
 Pluralis table

Awards
Awards include:
 1998 Spectrum Award for Product Excellence, London
 1999 ID-prisen, Runner chair, DK
 1999 G Prize, Japan
 2003 Red Dot Award, Germany
 2003 Danish Furniture Award, DK
 2003 Le Grand Prix du Design, France
 2005 Knud V. Engelhardts Grant, DK
 2010 Finn Juul Prize, DK
 2010 Danish Design award
 2010 Designer of the year, Bo Bedre
 2010 Design Week Award for the NAP chair
 2011 Salto & Sigsgaard, winners of the competition “New furniture for The Trusteeship Council chamber in United Nations, NY.”
 2012 Thorvald Bindesbøll medaljen
 2013	Reddot design award, Germany

Exhibitions
Exhibitions include:
 Cabinetmaker's Guild Exhibition, Copenhagen (1997, 1998, 1999)
 The Design Yearbook, Copenhagen (curated by Philippe Starck (1997)
 Spectrum, London (1998)
 Living Danish Design, London (1999)
 Walk the Plank I & II, Danish Museum of Art & Design, Copenhagen (2000 and 2004)
 The Danish Wave, various locations (2000)
 Le Danemark Bouge, Paris (2002)
 Arne Jacobsen 100 Years, Maison du Danemark, Paris (2002)
 Young Nordic Design: The Generation X, New York, Washington D.C., Mexico City, Helsinki, Berlin, Montreal, Vancouver, Ottawa, Glasgow, Reykjavik (2002)
 Shh…Craft is Golden!, Zona Tortona, Milan Furniture Fair, Milan (2009)

References

Danish furniture designers
Danish industrial designers
1967 births
Designers from Copenhagen
Living people